Welland is a city in Ontario, Canada.

Welland may also refer to:

Places
 Welland (electoral district), named after the city in Canada
 Welland, Illinois, United States
 Welland (Kettering BC Ward), Northamptonshire
 Welland, South Australia, a suburb of Adelaide in Australia
 Welland, Washington, an unincorporated community in the United States
 Welland, Worcestershire, a village in England
 Welland Estate, Cambridgeshire, England
 River Welland in the east of England
 Welland River in Ontario, Canada, named after its English counterpart
 Welland Canal, named after the Canadian river

People with the surname 
Colin Welland (1934–2015), British actor
Mark Welland, head of the Nanoscience Centre at Cambridge University
Michael Welland (1946-2017), British petroleum geologist
Roy Welland, American bridge player

Other
 The Rolls-Royce Welland, an early turbojet named after the English river